The GWR was the longest-lived of the pre-nationalisation railway companies in Britain, surviving the 'Grouping' of the railways in 1923 almost unchanged. As a result, the history of its numbering and classification of locomotives is relatively complicated. This page explains the principal systems that were used.

 For information about individual classes and locomotives, see: Locomotives of the Great Western Railway

Numbering

Broad Gauge Era
From the start, the GWR gave names only to its broad gauge locomotive stock. However, many classes carried 'themed' names, e.g. stars or signs of the zodiac, which aided identification of locomotives to some extent. See List of 7-foot gauge railway locomotive names

The exception to this rule was that any broad gauge locomotives the GWR absorbed from other railways (in particular, the South Devon Railway and Bristol and Exeter Railway) were given numbers in the 2000-2199 series. This applied even where locomotives had carried names under their previous owner (indeed, these names were usually removed by the GWR) and even when the locomotives had originally belonged to the GWR and had been sold out of stock.

Towards the end of the broad gauge era, a number of locomotives were built to a design that enabled them to be easily converted from one gauge to the other (hence the term 'convertibles' used for these locomotives). These engines also carried numbers in the standard gauge series, whether or not they were running in broad gauge form.

Standard Gauge 1854-1875
Initially standard gauge locomotive numbering was a simple sequential system, starting from 1. Numbering in this series, which included new locomotives and those absorbed from other railways, eventually reached 1297.
New locomotives were identified as being paid from either revenue or capital account. Initially an effort was made to treat the numbering of locomotives bought out of revenue differently from those out of capital, including by re-using old numbers left vacant following withdrawal, using a duplicate number system (unusually, giving the new locomotives an A suffix - other railways tended to apply such notation to the old locomotive being replaced) and, for a few years, using the series 1000 (later 1001) upwards. In 1875, the sequential system starting at 1 reached 1000 and then jumped to 1116, the other side of the latter range of numbers still carried.

Standard Gauge 1875-1902
Under William Dean's leadership, blocks of numbers were allocated for different locomotive types, as follows:

The only exceptions to these principles under Dean were use of the 20xx, 21xx, and 27xx series for goods tank engines after the end of broad gauge operations. Experimental locomotives and other small classes continued to be numbered in gaps left following withdrawals in the number series below 1000.

Standard Gauge 1902-1912
Under George Jackson Churchward, the system applied by William Dean broke down, and new classes simply took the next free block of hundred numbers starting at xx01, with experimental engines numbered in odd gaps in the earlier series of numbers, usually below 110.

1912 Renumbering
In December 1912 (the official date being 28 December), the GWR undertook a renumbering of some of its locomotives — mainly 4-4-0 classes — so that locomotives of the same class were numbered consecutively. This desirable aim was made more important following the rebuilding of some Duke and Atbara locomotives to Bulldog and City class designs. A few of the changes were connected with a decision that blocks of numbers for each class should start at xx00 rather than xx01 as previously.

Standard Gauge 1912 onwards
From the time of the 1912 renumbering, a system was adopted for new locomotives where the second digit indicated the broad type of locomotive. For example, express passenger locomotives had x0xx numbers and large mixed traffic tender locomotives were x9xx. When a class numbered more than 100 locos, rather than continue the numbers consecutively the second digit remained constant (e.g. 4900 Class included 4900-4999,  5900-5999, and 6900 onwards).

At the same time, a change was made so that new classes usually commenced from the number xx00. There was a certain amount of renumbering so that the prototype locomotives for existing classes took the appropriate xx00 number before the series used by production locomotives. Thus, from this time on, numbers below 2000 were mainly occupied by old, absorbed or otherwise non-standard locomotives.

The steam rail motors, diesel railcars and the diesel shunters were each numbered into their own sequences, all beginning at 1. (The 1911 petrol-electric railcar was numbered 100.)

1923 Renumbering
In 1923, the GWR absorbed a number of small railway companies as part of the Grouping. The locomotives that it inherited were renumbered into gaps in the number series below 2199 left vacant by the withdrawal of older locomotives. Many of these engines were withdrawn after a short period of time, but those that survived in 1946 were subject to another renumbering to rationalise the system further (see below).

The bulk of the locomotives absorbed were renumbered into gaps in broad number ranges according to their wheel arrangement. Locomotives from the following railways were included in this scheme: Alexandra Docks Railway, Barry Railway, Cambrian Railways, Cardiff Railway, Midland and South Western Junction Railway, Port Talbot Railway, Rhondda and Swansea Bay Railway, Rhymney Railway, South Wales Mineral Railway, Taff Vale Railway, Vale of Rheidol Railway, and Welshpool and Llanfair Light Railway.

Locomotives from the Brecon and Merthyr Railway, Burry Port and Gwendraeth Valley Railway and Neath and Brecon Railway were also renumbered according to their wheel arrangement, but used a different set of number ranges.

The number ranges used for all these locomotives are set out below, but note that those engines that had previously been sold out of stock by the GWR regained their original GWR numbers, and were not allocated new numbers in these ranges:

The locomotives inherited by the GWR from other concerns were renumbered as follows:
 Ex-Cleobury Mortimer and Ditton Priors Light Railway 0-6-0T engines became 28-29.
 Locomotives from the Llanelli & Mynydd Mawr Railway, Powesland and Mason and Swansea Harbour Trust were absorbed after the original numbering series had been drawn up, and these were fitted into available gaps without reference to the original number ranges. In some case they took the numbers of other absorbed engines that had already been withdrawn.
 In the 1940s, the Corris Railway and Weston, Clevedon and Portishead Railway were absorbed. The four engines inherited from these two concerns took GWR numbers 3-6.

1946 Renumbering
By 1946, the majority of the locomotives inherited at the 1923 Grouping had been withdrawn, as had most of the older GWR engines numbered below 2000. In order to tidy up the gaps in this number range, it was decided to renumber the surviving locomotives from each pre-Grouping company together. The series used were:
 1: ex-Ystalyfera Tin Works
 7-9: ex-Vale of Rheidol Railway
 30-96: ex-Rhymney Railway
 193-399: ex-Taff Vale Railway and Barry Railway
 421-436: ex-Brecon and Merthyr Railway
 1140-1147: ex-Swansea Harbour Trust
 1150-1153: ex-Powesland and Mason

Oil burning locomotives
In 1946/7 a number of locomotives were converted to burn oil, and some were renumbered in the process. Eleven 4900 Hall Class locos were renumbered into the 3900 range. Twelve 2800 Class 2-8-0s and eight of the 2884 Class were renumbered into the 4800 range. To make way for these, the 4800 Class 0-4-2Ts were renumbered to the 1400 range. (In addition, five 4073 Castle Class and one 4300 Class 2-6-0 were converted, but not renumbered.) All engines were converted back to coal firing by 1950, and regained their original numbers. However, the 1400s were never renumbered back to 4800s.

Application by British Railways
When the GWR was nationalised as part of British Railways in 1948, its steam locomotives retained their numbers unchanged and new steam engines built to GWR designs continued to be allocated numbers in the same way as the GWR had done. However, its diesel locomotives were completely renumbered. They took numbers 15100-15107 in the 15xxx series allocated to pre-Nationalisation design diesel shunters.

 see: British Rail locomotive and multiple unit numbering and classification

Summary of post-1902 class numbering

Classification
A very simple system was adopted, whereby the name (for broad-gauge locomotives) or number of the first locomotive in a class became the classification for all locomotives in that class (e.g. 'Sun Class', '4000 Class'). After the end of the broad gauge, names were applied to principal passenger and mixed-traffic standard-gauge locomotives. These were often based on a single theme, which could also lend its name to describe a class, for example 'Stars', also known as the '4000 Class', whose names included 'North Star', 'Rising Star' etc.

However, the classes of locomotives inherited at the Grouping in 1923 continued to be referred to by the classification allocated to them by their original owner.

See also
Great Western Railway Power and Weight Classification

Notes

References

 
 
 
 
 
 

 Locomotive numbering and classification
Locomotive classification systems